The Indian hog deer (Axis porcinus) is a small deer native to the Indo-Gangetic Plain in Pakistan, northern India, Nepal, Bangladesh to mainland Southeast Asia. It also occurs in western Thailand, and is possibly extirpated from China (in southwestern Yunnan Province), Myanmar, Laos, and Vietnam. Introduced populations exist in Australia, as well as the United States (in Texas, Hawaii, and Florida), and Sri Lanka (where its native status is disputed).

Its name derives from the hog-like manner in which it runs through forests (with its head hung low), to ease ducking under obstacles instead of leaping over them, like most other deer.

Taxonomy 
Cervus porcinus was the scientific name used by Eberhard August Wilhelm von Zimmermann in 1777 and 1780, based on an earlier description of Indian hog deer brought to England from India.
It was placed in the genus Axis by William Jardine in 1835 and by Brian Houghton Hodgson in 1847.
In 2004, it was proposed to be placed in the genus Hyelaphus. The proposal has not been accepted, with most authors keeping it under Axis. A subspecies, A. p. annamiticus, was once considered its own species, but is now generally considered the same species as A. porcinus.

Description

They are very solidly built, with a long body and relatively short legs; the line of the back slopes upward from the shoulders to a high rump. The ears are rounded; older animals tend to become light coloured in the face and neck.
The Indian hog deer's coat is quite thick, and generally a uniform dark-brown in winter, except for the underparts of the body and legs, which are lighter in colour. During late spring, the change to a summer coat of rich reddish-brown commences, although this may vary between individuals. Many hog deer show a dark dorsal stripe extending from the head down the back of the neck, and along the spine. In summer, there is usually a uniform row of light-coloured spots along either side of the dorsal stripe from the shoulders to the rump. The tail is fairly short and brown, but tipped with white. The underside of the tail is white, and the deer can fan the white hairs out in a distinctive alarm display.

Indian hog deer have preorbital glands on the face just below the eyes and metatarsal glands located high on the side of the rear legs. Pedal glands are located between the cleaves or toes of the hind hooves.

The antlers of a mature hog deer stag are typically three tined, having a brow tine and a solid main beam terminating in inner and outer top tines. However, antlers with more points are not uncommon. The distinctive features of typical hog deer antlers are the acute angle between the brow tine and main beam, and the fact that the inner tops tend to be short and angle back from the main beam and across towards the opposite antler.

Behaviour and ecology

The Indian hog deer is gregarious only when conditions are favorable and do not form a "unit" at these times, fleeing in different directions rather than in a herd. When alarmed, hog deer make a whistling vocalization or a warning bark. Home ranges vary widely in size, but average about 0.70 km2. Males are aggressive, and may become territorial at low population densities, marking the boundaries with glandular secretions. During the rut, males gather in open meadows, pawing the ground during antagonistic encounters. Harems are not created, with males courting and defending a single female at any given time. Unlike many other deer species, hog deer do not have a rutting call. Population densities may be as low as 0.1 animals per square kilometer in riverine valleys, rising to over 19 individuals per square kilometer in grassy flood plains.

The tiger, leopard, and clouded leopard are known predators of the Indian hog deer. Other known predators include the Burmese python and dhole.

See also
Chital
Sambar deer

References

External links 

Axis
Mammals of Asia
Mammals of India
Mammals of Pakistan
Mammals of Southeast Asia
Mammals of Thailand
Introduced mammals of Australia
Mammals described in 1780
Taxa named by Eberhard August Wilhelm von Zimmermann